San Javier Municipality may refer to:
 San Javier Municipality, Beni, Bolivia
 San Javier Municipality, Sonora, Mexico
 San Javier Municipality, Jalisco, Mexico

See also
 San Javier (disambiguation)

Municipality name disambiguation pages